Temisgam is a village in the Leh district of Ladakh, India. It is located in the Khalsi tehsil. The Tingmosgang castle and monastery are located here.

Demographics 
According to the 2011 census of India, Temisgam has 234 households. The effective literacy rate (i.e. the literacy rate of population excluding children aged 6 and below) is 75.48%.

References

Villages in Khalsi tehsil